Hans-Joachim Born (8 May 1909 – 15 April 1987) was a German radiochemist trained and educated at the Kaiser-Wilhelm-Institut für Chemie. Up to the end of World War II, he worked in Nikolaj Vladimirovich Timofeev-Resovskij's Abteilung für Experimentelle Genetik, at the Kaiser-Wilhelm-Institut für Hirnforschung. He was taken prisoner by the Russians at the close of World War II.  After rescue from the Krasnoyarsk PoW camp, he initially worked in Nikolaus Riehl's group at Plant No. 12 in Elektrostal’, Russia, but at the end of 1947 was sent to work in Sungul' at a sharashka known under the cover name Ob’ekt 0211. At the Sungul' facility, he again worked in a biological research department under the direction of Timofeev-Resovskij. Upon arrival in East Germany in the mid-1950s, Born became the director of the Institut für Angewandte Isotopenforschung in Buch, Berlin.  He also completed his Habilitation at the Technische Hochschule Dresden,  where he then also became a professor on the Fakultät für Kerntechnik. In 1957, he received and accepted a call to become a professor of radiochemistry at the Technische Hochschule München in West Germany.

Education

Born was born in Berlin. He trained and educated as a radiochemist under Otto Hahn at the Kaiser-Wilhelm-Institut für Chemie. Upon receipt of his doctorate, he was then an Assistent (Assistant) to Hahn, in the 1930s.

Career

In Germany

Born worked at the Kaiser-Wilhelm-Institut für Hirnforschung (KWIH, Kaiser Wilhelm Institute for Brain Research) of the Kaiser-Wilhelm Gesellschaft, in Berlin-Buch. At the KWIH, he was in Nikolaj Vladimirovich Timofeev-Resovskij's Abteilung für Experimentelle Genetik (Department for Experimental Genetics), a world-renowned department with the status of an institute. At the KWIH, Born examined the distribution of Radionuclides in the organs of rodents, and he also worked with fission products from research programs conducted under Nikolaus Riehl, scientific director of the Auergesellschaft, who was a participant in the German nuclear energy project Uranverein.

What happened to Born after the Russians entered Berlin, at the close of World War II, is best understood in the context of his colleague Karl Zimmer at the KWIH, who also had a professional relationship with Nikolaus Riehl at the Auergesellschaft.

At the close of World War II, Russia had special search teams operating in Austria and Germany, especially in Berlin, to identify and "requisition" equipment, materiel, intellectual property, and personnel useful to the Soviet atomic bomb project.  The exploitation teams were under the Russian Alsos, and they were headed by Lavrenij Beria's deputy, Colonel General A. P. Zavenyagin. These teams were composed of scientific staff members, in NKVD officer's uniforms, from the bomb project's only laboratory, Laboratory No. 2, in Moscow.  In mid-May 1945, the Russian nuclear physicists Georgy Flerov and Lev Artsimovich, in NKVD colonel's uniforms, compelled Zimmer to take them to the location of Riehl and his staff, who had evacuated their Auergesellschaft facilities and were west of Berlin, hoping to be in an area occupied by the American or British military forces.  Riehl was detained at the search team's facility in Berlin-Friedrichshagen for a week. This sojourn in Berlin turned into 10 years in the Soviet Union!  Riehl and his staff, including their families, were flown to Moscow on 9 July 1945.  Riehl was to head up a group at Plant No. 12 in Ehlektrostal’ (Электросталь).

In Russia

From 1945 to 1950, Riehl was in charge of a group at Plant No. 12 in Ehlektrostal', which had been assigned the task of industrializing reactor-grade uranium production.  When Riehl learned that H. J. Born and Karl Zimmer were being held in Krasnogorsk, in the main PoW camp for Germans with scientific degrees, Riehl arranged though Zavenyagin to have them sent to Ehlektrostal’. Alexander Catsch, who had been taken prisoner with Zimmer, was also sent to the Ehlektrostal’ Plant No. 12. Riehl had a hard time incorporating Born, Catsch, and Zimmer into his tasking on uranium production, as Born was a radiochemist, Catsch was a physician and radiation biologist, and Zimmer was a physicist and radiation biologist. Born's family arrived in Ehlektrostal’ on 20 August 1946.

After the detonation of the Russian uranium bomb, uranium production was going smoothly and Riehl's oversight was no longer necessary at Plant No. 12. Riehl then went, in 1950, to head an institute in Sungul', where he stayed until 1952. Essentially the remaining personnel in his group were assigned elsewhere, with the exception of H. E. Ortmann, A. Baroni (PoW), and Herbert Schmitz (PoW), who went with Riehl. However, Riehl had already sent Born, Catsch, and Zimmer to the institute in December 1947. The institute in Sungul’ was responsible for the handling, treatment, and use of radioactive products generated in reactors, as well as radiation biology, dosimetry, and radiochemistry. The institute was known as Laboratory B, and it was overseen by the 9th Chief Directorate of the NKVD (MVD after 1946), the same organization which oversaw the Russian Alsos operation. The scientific staff of Laboratory B – a ShARAShKA – was both Soviet and German, the former being mostly political prisoners or exiles, although some of the service staff were criminals. (Laboratory V, in Obninsk, headed by Heinz Pose, was also a sharashka and working on the Soviet atomic bomb project. Other notable Germans at the facility were Werner Czulius, Hans Jürgen von Oertzen, Ernst Rexer, and Carl Friedrich Weiss.)

Laboratory B was known under another cover name as Объект 0211 (Ob’ekt 0211, Object 0211), as well as Object B. (In 1955, Laboratory B was closed. Some of its personnel were transferred elsewhere, but most of them were assimilated into a new, second nuclear weapons institute, Scientific Research Institute-1011, NII-1011, today known as the Russian Federal Nuclear Center All-Russian Scientific Research Institute of Technical Physics, RFYaTs–VNIITF. NII-1011 had the designation предприятие п/я 0215, i.e., enterprise post office box 0215 and Объект 0215; the latter designation has also been used in reference to Laboratory B after its closure and assimilation into NII-1011.)

One of the political prisoners in Laboratory B was Riehls’ colleague from the KWIH, N. V. Timofeev-Resovskij, who, as a Soviet citizen, was arrested by the Soviet forces in Berlin at the conclusion of the war, and he was sentenced to 10 years in the Gulag. In 1947, Timofeev-Resovskij was rescued out of a harsh Gulag prison camp, nursed back to health, and sent to Sungul' to complete his sentence, but still make a contribution to the Soviet atomic bomb project. At Laboratory B, Timofeev-Resovskij headed a biophysics research department, in which Born, Catsch, and Zimmer were able to conduct work similar to that which they had done in Germany, and all three became section heads in Timofeev-Resovskij's department. Specifically, Born examined fission products, developed methods of separating plutonium from fission products created in a nuclear reactor, and investigated and developed radiation health and safety measures.

In preparation for release from the Soviet Union, it was standard practice to put personnel into quarantine for a few years if they worked on projects related to the Soviet atomic bomb project, as was the case for Born. Additionally, in 1954, the Deutsche Demokratische Republik (DDR, German Democratic Republic) and the Soviet Union prepared a list of scientists they wished to keep in the DDR, due to their having worked on projects related to the Soviet atomic bomb project; this list was known as the "A-list". On this A-list were the names of 18 scientists. Nine, possibly 10, of the names were associated with the Riehl group which worked at Plant No. 12 in Ehlektrostal’. Born, Catsch, Riehl, and Zimmer were on the list.

In Germany again

Born returned to Germany in the mid-1950s and eventually went West. Riehl arrived in the DDR on 4 April 1955, and by early June he was in the Federal Republic of Germany (FRG). Other colleagues of Riehl who worked with him in Russia also went West;  Alexander Catsch went to the Federal Republic of Germany (FRG), Günter Wirths fled to the FRG and Karl Zimmer went legally.

Upon arrival in the DDR, Born became the director of the Institut für Angewandte Isotopenforschung (Institute for Applied Isotope Research) in Berlin-Buch.  He also completed his Habilitation  at the Technische Hochschule Dresden (after a reorganization and renaming in 1961: Technische Universität Dresden), where he then became a professor on the Fakultät für Kerntechnik (Faculty for Nuclear Technology). In 1957, he received and accepted a call to become a professor of radiochemistry at the Technische Hochschule München, which in 1970 was reorganized and renamed the Technische Universität München. At the Technische Hochschule, he was affiliated with the Institut für Radiochemie. Born died in Munich.

Selected publications

The majority of these literature citations have been garnered by searching on variations of the author's name on Google, Google Scholar, and the Energy Citations Database.

H. J. Born Title Experiments with Radioactive Phosphorus in Rats [In German], Naturwissenschaften Volume 28, 476 (1940)
H. J. Born, N. W. Timofeeff-Ressovsky, and K. G. Zimmer Anwendungen der Neutronen und der künstlich radioaktiven Stoffe in Chemie und Biologe, Umschau Volume 45, # 6, 83-87 (1941)
H. J. Born, N. W. Timoféeff-Ressovsky and K. G. Zimmer Biologische Anwendungen des Zählrohres, Naturwissenschaften Volume 30, Number 40, 600-603 (1942).  The authors were identified as being in the Genetics Department of the Kaiser Wilhelm Institute in Berlin-Buch.
 G. I. (H. J.) Born, N. Riehl, K. G. Zimmer Efficiency of Luminescence Production by Beta Rays in Zinc Sulfide [In Russian], Doklaky Akademii Nauk S.S.S.R.  Volume 59, March 1269 – 1272 (1948)
H. J. Born Habilitationsschrift: Radiochemie und Anwendung radioaktiver Isotope, Technische Hochschule Dresden (1956)
G. I. (H. J.) Born, K. F. Vayss, M. G. Kobaladze On Resolution of Some Analytical Problems Pertaining to Rare Earths by Means of Radioactivation Analysis [In Russian], Trans. Comm. Anal. Khim. Akad. Nauk S.S.S.R. Volume 7, No. 10, 104-118 (1956). Translated from Referat. Zhur. Khim. No. 4, 1957, Abstract No. 12059. Institutional affiliation: Commission on Analytical Chemistry of the Academy of Sciences, USSR.
H.-J. Born and H. Stärk Quantitative Determination of Iodine and Iodine Compounds on Chromatographic Paper. By Neutron Activation, Atomkernenergie Volume 4, 286-289 (1959). Institutional affiliation: Technische Hochschule München.
H. J. Born The Significance of Preparative Radiochemistry for the Application of Radio-Nuclides in Research and Industry, Kerntechnik Volume 3, 515-518 (1961). Institutional affiliation: Technische Universität München.
P. Wilkniss and H. J. Born On the Activation Analysis of Oxygen with Help of the Reaction O16 (T,n) F18, Intern. J. Appl. Radiation and Isotopes Volume 10, 133-136 (1961). Institutional affiliation: Technische Hochschule München.
H. J. Born and H. J. Marcinowski Production and Application of Radionuclides in Europe [In German], Kerntechnik (West Germany) Merged with Atomkernenergie to form Atomkernenerg./ Kerntech.kyu Hokoku; Vol: 4, 573-579 (1962). Institutional affiliation: Isotopen-Studiengesellschaft e.V., Frankfurt am Main.
H. J. Born The Mechanism of Molecule Formation by Nuclear Fission and Subsequent Processes in Solid Mixtures, Report Number: EUR-2209.e (1964). Institutional affiliation: Munich. Technische Hochschule München.
D. C. Aumann and H. J. Born Determination of the 18O Concentration in Water by Irradiation with Neutrons [In German], Naturwissenschaften Volume 51, 159 (1964). Institutional affiliation: Technische Hochschule München.
D. C. Aumann and H. J. Born Activation Determination of Lithium Using the Reaction Chain 6Li (n,alpha) 3H and 16O (T,n) 18F' [In German], Radiochimica Acta Volume 3, 62-73 (1964). Institutional affiliation: Technische Hochschule München.
 H. J. Born and D. C. Aumann Activation Analysis Determination of Lithium with the Help of the Reaction Chain 6Li (n,d) 3H and 16O (T,n) 18F, Naturwissenschaften Volume 51, 159-160 (1964). Institutional affiliation: Technische Hochschule München.
D. C. Aumann and H. J. Born Determination of Some Light Elements by Secondary Reactions, Proceedings of 1965 International Conference on Modern Trends in Activation Analysis College Station, Texas, Texas A and M University, 265-271 (1965). Institutional affiliation: Technische Hochschule München.
D. C. Aumann, H. J. Born, and R. Henkelmann Use of Fast Reactor Neutrons for Rapid and Nondestructive Trace Analysis, Especially of Oxygen [In German], Z. Anal. Chem. Volume 221, 101-108 (1966). Institutional affiliation: Technische Hochschule München.
P. Wilkniss and H. J. Born Radiochemical Separation of 18F from Reactor Irradiated Gold and Uranium [In German], Int. J. Appl. Radiat. Isotop. Volume 17, 304-306 (1996). Institutional affiliation: Technische Hochschule München.
P. E. Wilkniss and H. J. Born Activation Analysis of Oxygen at the Surface of Solids, Int. J. Appl. Radiat. Isotop. Volume 18, 57-64 (1967). Institutional affiliation: Technische Hochschule München.
C. Turkowsky, H. Stärk, and H. J. Born Determination of Traces of Uranium in Rocks and Minerals by Neutron Activation [In German], Radiochim. Acta 8: 27-30 (1967). Institutional affiliation: Technische Hochschule München.
G. Höhlein, H. J. Born, and W. Weinländer  Isolation of 242Cm from Neutron-irradiated 241Am, Radiochim. Acta 10: 85-91(1968). Institutional affiliation: Technische Universität München.
H. W. Johlige, D. C. Aumann, and H.-J. Born Determination of the Relative Electron Density at the Be Nucleus in Different Chemical Combinations, Measured as Changes in the Electron-Capture Half-Life of 7Be, Phys. Rev. C 2, Issue 5, 1616 - 1622 (1970). Institutional affiliation: Institut für Radiochemie at the Technische Hochschule München. Received 24 November 1969; revised 22 May 1970.
E. A. Timofeeva-Reskovskaya, Yu. I. Moskalev, and G. I. (H. J.) Born, Distribution of 228Ac Following Intravenous Injection [In Russian], Trudy Inst. Ekol. Rast. Zhivotn. No. 68, 23-30 (1970)
H. J. Born, G. Höhlein, B. Schütz, S. Specht, and W. Weinländer Facility for the Complete Processing of Actinide Targets in the Multi-Ci Range, Kerntechnik 12: 75-80 (1970). Institutional affiliation: Technische Hochschule München.
H. J. Born Activation analysis, Technical Report Number BMBW-FBK—72-13, 1st Seminar on Activation Analysis, 8 December 1970, Garching.
A. Alian and H. J. Born Extraction of Terbium with Bis(ethyl 2-hexyl) Phosphoric Acid from Mixed Media, Radiochim. Acta Volume 17, No. 3, 168 (1972). Institutional affiliation: Technische Univ. Munich
A. Alian, H. H. Born, and H. Stärk Determination of molybdenum in standard rocks and in Scheelite Ores. Activation analysis by extraction of daughter nuclides., Radiochim. Acta ;18: No. 1, 50-57 (1972). Institutional affiliation: Technische Universität München.
A. Alian, H. J. Born, and H. Stärk Title Radiochemical and activation analysis by extraction of daughter nuclides. Determination of molybdenum, International Conference On modern Trends in Activation Analysis, 2 October 1972, Saclay, France.
A. Alian, H. J. Born, and J. L. Kim Thermal and epithermal neutron activation analysis using the monostandard method , International Conference On modern Trends in Activation Analysis, 2 October 1972, Saclay, France.
J. L. Kim, H. Lagally, and H. J. Born Ion exchange in aqueous and in aqueous—organic solvents. Part I. Anion-exchange behavior of Zr, Nb, Ta, and Pa in aqueous HCl—HF and in HCl—HF—organic solvent, Anal. Chim. Acta Volume 64, No. 1, 29-43 (1973). Institutional affiliation: Technische Universität München.
J. I. Kim, H. Lagally, and H. J. Born Ion exchange in aqueous and in aqueous—organic solvents. Part I. Anion-exchange behavior of Zr, Nb, Ta, and Pa in aqueous HCl—HF and in HCl—HF—organic solvent, Anal. Chim. Acta Volume 64, No. 1, 29-43 (1973)
H. J. Born and J. L. Kim Monostandard activation analysis and its applications: analyses of kale powder and NBS standard glass samples, J. Radioanal. Chem. Volume 13, No. 2, 427-442  (1973). Institutional affiliation: Technische Universität München.
R. Henkelmann and H.-J. Born Analytical use of neutron-capture gamma-rays, Journal of Radioanalytical and Nuclear Chemistry Volume 16, Number 2, 473-481, (1973). Current address of Henkelmann: Institut Laue-Langevin, 38-Grenoble, France. Institutional affiliation of Born: Institut für Radiochemie of the Technischen Universität München.
B. O. Schütz, S. Specht, and H. J. Born Title Choice of operation parameters of ion-exchange columns for separations of highly radioactive nuclides, Reactor meeting, 10 April 1973, Karlsruhe, Germany. Institutional affiliation: Technische Universität München. (Zentralstelle für Atomkernenergie-Dokumentation, Leopoldshafen, 1973).
R. Henkelmann and H. J. Born Analytical use of neutron-capture gamma-rays, J. Radioanal. Chem. Volume 16, No. 2, 473-481 (1973). International Conference on Modern Trends in Activation Analysis; 2 October 1972; Saclay, France. Institutional affiliation: Technische Universität München.
A. Alian, H. J. Born, and J. L. Kim Thermal and epithermal neutron activation analysis using the monostandard method, J. Radioanal. Chem.  Volume 15, No. 2, 535-546 (1973). International Conference on Modern Trends in Activation Analysis; 2 October 1972; Saclay, France. Institutional affiliation: Technische Universität München.
H. Duschner, H. J. Born, and J. I. Kim Electrodeposition of protactinium as fluoride from organic solvents, Int. J. Appl. Radiat. Isotop., Volume 24, No. 8, 433-436 (1973). Institutional affiliation: Technische Hochschule München.
S. Specth, R. F. Nolte, and H. J. Born Influence of the geometry of the stationary phase on the efficiency of extraction chromatographic systems, J. Radioanal. Chem.  Volume 21, No. 1, 119-127 (1974). 7th Radiochemical Conference; April 1973; Marianske Lazne, Czechoslovakia. Institutional affiliation: Technische Universität München.
S. Specht, B. O. Schütz, and H. J. Born Development of a high-pressure ion-exchange system for rapid preparative separations of transuranium elements, J. Radioanal. Chem., Volume 21, No. 1, pp. 167–176 (1974). 7th Radiochemical Conference; April 1973; Marianske Lazne, Czechoslovakia. Institutional affiliation: Technische Universität München.
V. Dronov, S. Specth, W. Weinländer, and H. J. Born Change of the efficiency of the chromatographic system in transition to higher activities. I. Comparison of alpha and gamma radiolysis of a cation exchanger with respect to its change in weight, salt separation capacity, and residual capacity and its swelling power [In German], J. Radioanal. Chem. , Volume 24, No. 2, 393-409 (1975). Institutional affiliation: Technischen Universität München.
R. Henkelmann, K. Müller, and H. J. Born Title Determination of low-dose boron-implanted concentration profiles in silicon by the (n, alpha) reaction, Trans. Am. Nucl. Soc., Suppl., Volume 21, No. 3, 14 (1975). International Nuclear and Atomic Activation Analysis Conference and 19th Annual Meeting on Analytical Chemistry in Nuclear Technology, 14 October 1975; Gatlinburg, TN. Institutional affiliation: Technische Universität München.
S. Specht, V. Dornow, W. Weinländer, and H. J. Born Variation of the capacity of chromatographic systems in transitions to high activities. II. Comparison of the effect of alpha and gamma radiolysis of a cation exchanger on the distribution coefficient, separation factor, and plate heights [In German], J. Radioanal. Chem. Volume 26, No. 1, 17-30 (1975). Institutional affiliation: Technischen Universität München.
Hans-Joachim Born, Gerd Hüttenrauch, Heinz-Joachim Link, X-ray diagnostics installation for peripheral angiography examinations, Patent number: 5349625. Filing date: March 11, 1993. Issue date: September 20, 1994. Assignee: Siemens Aktiengesellschaft.

Publications of the KFK and ZAED

H-J. Born, S. Krawczynski, W. Ochsenfeld, and H. Scholz Kernforschungszentrum Karlsruhe. Sonderabdrucke. 116. Verwendbarkeit von Dibutyläther für die Aufbereitung bestrahlter Kernbrennstoffe mittels Extraktion (Gesellschaft für Kernforschung m.b.H., 1962). Institutional affiliations: Institut für Radiochemie of the Technischen Hochschule München and Kernreaktor Bau- und Betriebsgesellschaft mbH, Karlsruhe, Institut für Heiße Chemie.
Hans-Joachim Born and Günter Höhlein Die Isolierung von 242Cm im 100Ci-Bereich aus neutronenbestrahltem 241Am (Zentralstelle für Atomkernenergie-Dokumentation, ZAED, 1968)
Hans-Joachim Born and Hans-Georg Meyer Zur Verteilung von Thorium-230, Thorium-232 und Uran-238 bei der Schwefelsäurelaugung von Uranerzen (Zentralstelle für Atomkernenergie-Dokumentation, 1968)
Knut Lorenzen and Hans-Joachim Born Untersuchungen zur photovoltaischen Konversion (Zentralstelle für Atomkernenergie-Dokumentation, 1968)

Notes

References

Albrecht, Ulrich, Andreas Heinemann-Grüder, and Arend Wellmann Die Spezialisten: Deutsche Naturwissenschaftler und Techniker in der Sowjetunion nach 1945 (Dietz, 1992, 2001) 
Herrlich, Peter Karl Gunther Zimmer (1911–1988), Radiation Research, Volume 116, Number 1, 178-180 (Oct., 1988)
Maddrell, Paul "Spying on Science: Western Intelligence in Divided Germany 1945–1961" (Oxford, 2006) 
Naimark, Norman M. The Russians in Germany: A History of the Soviet Zone of Occupation, 1945-1949 (Belknap, 1995)
Oleynikov, Pavel V. German Scientists in the Soviet Atomic Project, The Nonproliferation Review Volume 7, Number 2, 1 – 30  (2000).  The author has been a group leader at the Institute of Technical Physics of the Russian Federal Nuclear Center in Snezhinsk (Chelyabinsk-70).
Riehl, Nikolaus and Frederick Seitz Stalin's Captive: Nikolaus Riehl and the Soviet Race for the Bomb (American Chemical Society and the Chemical Heritage Foundations, 1996) .

External links
Habilitationsschrift - Technische Universität Dresden
R. Henkelmann - 50 Jahre NAA am Forschungsstandort Garching, Technische Universität München, Institut für RadiochemieZfK - 50 Jahre Forschung in Rossendorf, Zentralinstitut für Kernphysik''

20th-century German chemists
Radiation health effects researchers
Scientists from Berlin
1909 births
1987 deaths
German expatriates in the Soviet Union
Academic staff of the Technical University of Munich
Members of the German Academy of Sciences at Berlin